Jacques de Montmorency, sieur de Belleville (died c. 1640) was a 17th-century French violinist, lutenist, ballet master and composer.

He was one of Louis XIII of France's dance masters with Nicolas Dugap, Jacques Cordier called "Bocan" and Pierre Beauchamp.

27 mai 1637 he married Antoinette Guibourg, the widow of painter and theater costume designer Daniel Rabel.

Works 
He is best known for the great ballets of which he wrote the music and organized the choreography to the court of Louis XIII between 1615 and 1632, including:
1615: Ballet des petits Mores
1617: Ballet de la délivrance de Renaud, the stories are by Pierre Guédron
1619: Ballet de Tancrède
1620: Ballet de Psyché
1625: Ballet des Fées de la Forêt de Saint-Germain, the stories are by Antoine Boësset
1632: Ballet du château de Bicêtre

We also have orchestral suites and arrangements for lute tablature published in the compendium Airs de différents auteurs mis en tablature sur des accords nouveaux, Paris, 1631.

External links 
 Jacques de Belleville on Data.bnf.fr

French male classical composers
French Baroque composers
French ballet composers
1640s deaths
17th-century male musicians